= Free weight =

Free weight(s) may refer to:

- Free mass, the mass of a molecule
- Free weight (equipment), weight training equipment that is not connected to an external apparatus
